Barazlu (also Romanized as Bārāzlū; also known as Bāzār and Bārāz) is a village in Kuhestan Rural District, Qaleh Chay District, Ajab Shir County, East Azerbaijan Province, Iran. At the 2006 census, its population was 660, in 158 families.

References 

Populated places in Ajab Shir County